Nelusetta ayraud also known as the Chinaman-leatherjacket or ocean jacket is a filefish of the family Monacanthidae, found around Australia to depths of about .  This species grows to a length of  TL.  This species is a component of local commercial fisheries.

References

Monacanthidae
Fish described in 1824